Christine Mary Humphreys, Baroness Humphreys, is a Welsh Liberal Democrats peer and leader of the party's group in the House of Lords.

Humphreys is also a former President of the Welsh Liberal Democrats and was a Member of the Welsh Assembly for the North Wales regional constituency from 1999 to 2001. She has also been the Liberal Democrat spokesperson for Wales since 2015.

Before winning election to the National Assembly for Wales in 1999 she was a teacher and Head of Vocational Education in a Welsh Medium School in her home county of Conwy.

Political career

At the inaugural Assembly Election in 1999 she won a North Wales seat. She resigned on 22 March 2001 for health reasons and was succeeded by fellow Liberal Democrat Eleanor Burnham as Assembly Member for North Wales.

In November 2007 she was elected President of the party, defeating Bob Barton and John Last. She went on to serve two terms as party president, including one term as honorary president of the Welsh Young Liberals.

In August 2013 she was appointed a working peer, but she has said that she favours Lords Reform. She was created a life peer on 18 September 2013 taking the title Baroness Humphreys. of Llanrwst in the County of Conwy, and made a point of taking the oath in her native Welsh instead of the traditional English. Her maiden speech in the Lords focused on the significance of Welsh-language broadcasting.

References

Profile on BBC website September 1999

External links
Welsh Liberal Democrats Website
BBC News item of the resignation of Christine Humphreys

20th-century British women politicians
Life peeresses created by Elizabeth II
Female members of the Senedd
Living people
Liberal Democrat members of the Senedd
Liberal Democrats (UK) life peers
Wales AMs 1999–2003
Welsh-speaking politicians
Year of birth missing (living people)